Pinecroft, also known as the Powel Crosley Jr. Estate is located at 2366 Kipling Avenue in the Mount Airy neighborhood of Cincinnati, Ohio.  It is significant both as a Tudor Revival estate designed by Dwight James Baum, and for its association with the life of Powel Crosley Jr. (1886–1961), builder of the Crosley car and owner of the Cincinnati Reds.  It was listed on the National Register of Historic Places on December 17, 2008.

It is the 25th property listed as a featured property of the week in a program of the National Park Service that began in July, 2008.

See also
 National Register of Historic Places listings in Ohio

References

External links
Official website

Houses on the National Register of Historic Places in Ohio
National Register of Historic Places in Cincinnati
Historic districts on the National Register of Historic Places in Ohio
Houses in Cincinnati
Houses completed in 1937
1937 establishments in Ohio
Gilded Age mansions
Tudor Revival architecture in Ohio